The Men's 200 meter Race at the IPC Athletics Asia-Oceania Championship 2016 was held at the Dubai Police Club Stadium in Dubai from 7–12 March.

Results 
Legend

AS: Asian Record

WR: World Record

PB: Personal Best

SB: Season Best

Fn-False Start

Q- Qualified for Finals

q- Qualified for Finals as per best performance

DNF- Did Not Finish

DSQ- Disqualified

T11

Final 

Date- 12:March:2016

Time- 16:51

T13

Final 

Date- 09:March:2016

Time- 18:55

T34

Final 
Date- 07:March:2016
Time- 18:05

T35/36/38

Final 

Date- 11:March:2016

Time- 17:28

T37

Final 

Date- 11:March:2016

Time- 17:22

T42

Final 
Date- 07:March:2016
Time- 17:25

T44

Final 
Date- 07:March:2016
Time- 17:32

T47

Heat 1/2 
Date- 07:March:2016
Time- 17:05

Heat 2/2
Date- 07:March:2016
Time- 17:12

Final 
Date- 08:March:2016
Time- 17:28

T53

Final 

Date- 10:March:2016

Time- 16:45

T54

Final 

Date- 10:March:2016

Time- 17:02

References 

IPC Athletics Asia-Oceania Championship 2016